Hans-Jürgen Bauer-Neumaier (born 23 April 1968 in Obertaufkirchen) is a German sport shooter. He competed in pistol shooting events at the Summer Olympics in 1992, 1996, and 2000.

Olympic results

References

1968 births
Living people
ISSF pistol shooters
German male sport shooters
Olympic shooters of Germany
Shooters at the 1992 Summer Olympics
Shooters at the 1996 Summer Olympics
Shooters at the 2000 Summer Olympics